Cornelius Robert Walsh (April 23, 1882 – April 5, 1953) was a Major League Baseball pitcher who appeared in one game for the Pittsburgh Pirates in its 1907 season, allowing one earned run on one hit and a walk without a strikeout in just one inning of work..

External links

1882 births
1953 deaths
Major League Baseball pitchers
Baseball players from Missouri
Pittsburgh Pirates players
Minor league baseball managers
St. Joseph Packers players
Hutchinson Salt Packers players
Seattle Siwashes players
Cedar Rapids Rabbits players
St. Paul Saints (AA) players
Peoria Distillers players
Bloomington Bloomers players
Danville Speakers players
Davenport Blue Sox players
Moline Plowboys players
Henderson Hens players